Pietro Mário (1939 – August 31, 2020) was an Italian-born Brazilian actor, who was known for dubbing the role of Yoda.

Mário died from post-COVID-19 causes in 2020, aged 81.

References

1939 births
2020 deaths
Italian emigrants to Brazil
20th-century Brazilian male actors
21st-century Brazilian male actors
Deaths from the COVID-19 pandemic in Rio de Janeiro (state)